Doubletop Mountain is a mountain located in Piscataquis County, Maine, in Baxter State Park. 
According to Fannie Hardy Eckstorm, the mountain's Indigenous name was Psinskihegan-I-Outop. Psinskihegan means notch and I-Outop means head. in 1828 in the Survey of Maine, Moses Greenleaf called the mountain a variation Chinskihegan or Outop. It eventually became Doubletop, named for its two peaks. 

The mountain's two peaks are a north peak and a south peak. From Foster Field, to the south, a  trail leads to the summit. The north peak is wooded while the south peak is more open.

Beneath north peak, set in the rock, is a south facing bronze memorial tablet which reads:
KEPPELE HALL
JUNE 10, 1872—APRIL 25, 1926
HIS ASHES WERE GIVEN TO THE WINDS
AT THIS PLACE AUGUST 20, 1926, AT
SUNSET, BY HIS WIFE.
Keppele Hall's wife, Fanny Hall, was the first American woman to serve as foreman of a grand jury.

Geography 
Doubletop Mountain stands within the watershed of Nesowadnehunk Stream, which drains into the West Branch of the Penobscot River, and into Penobscot Bay. It is flanked to the southwest by Squaw's Bosom.

See also 
 List of mountains in Maine
 New England Fifty Finest

References 

Mountains of Piscataquis County, Maine
Mountains of Maine